State Route 144 (SR 144) is a primary state highway in the U.S. state of Virginia.  The state highway runs  from SR 36 at Fort Lee north to SR 145 at Centralia.  SR 144's east–west segment is the main highway between Colonial Heights and both Fort Lee and Hopewell.  The state highway's north–south section connects U.S. Route 1 (US 1) and US 301 in Colonial Heights with SR 10 in Chester. It was first added to the state highway system in 1930 as State Route 425 (SR 425) and had gained its current routing and designation by 1987.

Route description

SR 144 begins at a four-way intersection with SR 36 (Oaklawn Boulevard) at the northeastern corner of Fort Lee.  The south leg of the intersection is Sisisky Boulevard, which serves as one of the entrances to the military base.  SR 144 heads west as Temple Avenue, a four-lane divided highway that crosses a rail line and passes through an industrial area in far northern Prince George County before crossing the Appomattox River, which is split in two by Halls Island. While crossing the river, the state highway passes through a sliver of Chesterfield County before entering the independent city of Colonial Heights.  SR 144 passes through a commercial area that includes the Southpark Mall and the world's largest Arby's restaurant.  West of the mall, the state highway has a trumpet interchange with Interstate 95 (I-95, Richmond–Petersburg Turnpike) that is supplemented by a ramp from northbound SR 144 to northbound I-95.  West of the freeway, SR 144 reaches the western end of Temple Avenue and turns north to run concurrently with US 1 and US 301 along the city's main north–south thoroughfare, Boulevard.

SR 144, US 1, and US 301 follow Boulevard north through Colonial Heights, where the five-lane highway with a center left-turn lane passes under CSX's North End Subdivision.  The highways enter Chesterfield County by crossing Swift Creek into Chesterfield County and become Jefferson Davis Highway.  SR 144 splits northwest from the U.S. Highways to follow two-lane undivided Harrowgate Road through a suburban area to Chester.  There, the state highway has a brief concurrency with four-lane undivided SR 10 (West Hundred Road) to cross the North End Subdivision rail line.  SR 144 continues north on two-lane undivided Chester Road, which the highway follows to its northern terminus at SR 145 at Centralia.  SR 145 heads west as Centralia Road toward Chesterfield Court House and north as a continuation of Chester Road through an interchange with the SR 288 freeway.

History
What would become SR 144 was first commissioned in 1930 as SR 425. It was significantly shorter than today's route, only running  from State Route 407 in Chester to State Route 410 in Centralia. The route was given its current designation during the 1933 Virginia state highway renumbering.

Major intersections

References

External links

Virginia Highways Project: VA 425
Virginia Highways Project: VA 144

144
State Route 144
State Route 144
State Route 144